Destination was a disco studio group from New York City who had two chart entries: In 1979, "Move On Up" / "Up Up Up" / "Destination's Theme," which spent four weeks at number one on the Hot Dance Music/Club Play chart, and #68 on the Hot Soul Singles chart.  Their second release : "My Number One Request"/"From Mortishia To Gomez Addams" (which consisted of parts from the original Addams Family theme song) spent three weeks at number one on the Hot Dance Music/Club Play chart in 1980.  A trio, Destination consisted of Danny Lugo, Kathleen Bradley (who would later become one of "Barker's Beauties" on The Price Is Right) and Love Chyle Theus.

See also
List of number-one dance hits (United States)
List of artists who reached number one on the US Dance chart

References

External links
 Destination at Discogs.

American disco groups
American dance music groups